Rowland Babu Makati (born 13 January 2001) is a Kenyan football player who turns out for Kenyan Premier League club Nairobi City Stars.

Career

Makati turned out for Kawangware-based side Escalators before joining third-tier side Vapor Sports for the 2019-20 season. 

He was signed up by Nairobi City Stars in August 2020 on a long-term deal after being scouted during the Nairobi regional Chapa Dimba na Safaricom finals held at Jamhuri High School. 

In the 2020-21 season, he was sent on loan to second-tier side Nairobi Stima to gain work experience. He returned to his parent club City Stars for the 2021-22 FKF Premier League season. 

After a long wait,
he was handed his topflight debut on Mon 6 June 2022 by head coach Nicholas Muyoti after being introduced in the second half during a 33rd round 2021-22 FKF Premier League game against AFC Leopards at Thika Stadium.

References

Living people
2001 births
Kenyan footballers
Nairobi City Stars players
Kenyan Premier League players